Dmitri Sergeyevich Kirichenko (born 17 January 1977) is an association football coach and a former player – a striker, he is a former Russian international. He is an assistant coach with Sochi.

As of 10 March 2014, he is the 3rd all-time top scorer in the Russian Premier League (129 goals), and the 5th player by league appearances (377).

Club career
Kirichenko started his career playing for small clubs such as Lokomotiv Mineralnye Vody, Iskra Novoaleksandrovsk and Torpedo Taganrog. In 1998, he joined Rostselmash, following impressive performance for Taganrog club during the previous year.

He became one of the most promising Russian strikers during the next years, and joined CSKA Moscow in 2002. With the army men Kirichenko managed to become the league top scorer in 2002 (along with his teammate Rolan Gusev), won the Russian Premier League twice, and got the Russian Cup.

In 2005, he left for FC Moscow. Playing for the new team, he repeated his success, becoming the top scorer again.

He played for Saturn from 2007 to 2010. In 2008 in the first match of his team in the UEFA Intertoto Cup, in the victory 7–0, he scored 4 goals. He did not play in the second match of that round. At the next round he scored a goal at the first match in a 1–0 victory against 2007 German champions VfB Stuttgart. With 5 goals at total he became the top scorer of the UEFA Intertoto Cup 2008.

In 2011, after Saturn were dissolved due to financial problems, Kirichenko returned to Rostov, the club where he had made a name for himself back in the 1990s.

International career
He played for his country at Euro 2004, scoring the quickest ever goal in the European Football Championship – in the second minute against Greece.

Managerial career
He was appointed the caretaker manager of FC Rostov on 6 August 2016 following the resignation of Kurban Berdyev. His caretaking spell ended on 9 September 2016.

He was appointed the caretaker manager of FC Ufa on 7 November 2018. Ufa won their first game under his management against FC Spartak Moscow, but in the next 6 games the club only achieved 2 draws and 4 losses, and on 27 March 2019 Kirichenko left Ufa by mutual consent.

Career statistics

Club
Source:

International

Honours
CSKA Moscow
 Russian Premier League: 2003
 Russian Cup: 2001–02
 Russian Super Cup: 2004; runner-up: 2003

References

External links
 Club profile 
 Player profile 

1977 births
Living people
People from Novoalexandrovsk
Russian footballers
Russia international footballers
Russia under-21 international footballers
FC Rostov players
PFC CSKA Moscow players
UEFA Euro 2004 players
FC Moscow players
FC Saturn Ramenskoye players
Russian Premier League players
FC Mordovia Saransk players
FC Taganrog players
Russian football managers
FC Rostov managers
Russian Premier League managers
FC Ufa managers
Association football forwards
Sportspeople from Stavropol Krai
Russian people of Ukrainian descent